Extra Space Storage is a real estate investment trust headquartered in Cottonwood Heights, Utah that invests in self storage facilities. The company rents storage units, including climate controlled units, drive-up units, lockers, boat storage, RV storage and business storage. As of September 30, 2022 the company owned and/or operated 2,327 locations in 41 states, and Washington, D.C. comprising approximately 175.1 million square feet of net rentable space in 1.6 million storage units. It is the 2nd largest owner of self storage units in the United States and the largest self storage property manager.

Extra Space Storage has won NAREIT's Leader in the Light Award for superior and sustained sustainability efforts in 2020, 2021 and 2022. The company has solar installations at many of its properties and was listed on the "Top 25 Corporate Users by Number of Solar Installations" by the Solar Energy Industries Association.

References

External links
 
 

1977 establishments in Utah
2004 initial public offerings
Companies based in Salt Lake County, Utah
Companies listed on the New York Stock Exchange
Cottonwood Heights, Utah
American companies established in 1977
Financial services companies established in 1977
Real estate companies established in 1977
Real estate investment trusts of the United States
Storage companies